Bruce MacDonald (born 2 July 1960) is a Canadian sailor. He competed in the Star event at the 1988 Summer Olympics.

References

External links
 

1960 births
Living people
Canadian male sailors (sport)
Olympic sailors of Canada
Sailors at the 1988 Summer Olympics – Star
Sportspeople from Penticton